Zhang Qi (died 1048), originally named Zhang Min, was a high-ranking Song dynasty official and military general. He was one of the longest-serving ministers during Emperor Zhenzong's reign. He also served the assistant commissioner and commissioner of military affairs from 1025 to 1033 during the regency of Emperor Zhenzong's widow Empress Dowager Liu. He was well trusted by both Emperor Zhenzong and Empress Dowager Liu mainly because he had been their personal servant when all 3 were teenagers.

References

1048 deaths
Song dynasty politicians from Henan
Politicians from Kaifeng